Gmina Głusk is a rural gmina (administrative district) in Lublin County, Lublin Voivodeship, in eastern Poland. It takes its name from Głusk – this was formerly a village, but in 1988 was incorporated into the city of Lublin, and is therefore no longer a part of the territory of Gmina Głusk. Dominów serves as its administrative seat. The gmina lies to the south-east of the regional capital Lublin.

Villages
Gmina Głusk contains the villages and settlements of Abramowice Prywatne, Ćmiłów, Dominów, Głuszczyzna, Kalinówka, Kazimierzówka, Kliny, Majdan Mętowski, Mętów, Nowiny, Prawiedniki, Prawiedniki-Kolonia, Wilczopole, Wilczopole-Kolonia, Wólka Abramowicka and Żabia Wola.

Neighbouring gminas
Gmina Głusk is bordered by the towns of Lublin and Świdnik, and by the gminas of Jabłonna, Mełgiew, Niedrzwica Duża, Piaski and Strzyżewice.

References

Glusk
Lublin County